The 1930–31 British Ice Hockey season consisted of a Scottish League and a suspended English League.

The league in England was suspended due to the European and World Championships that took place during the season. Kelvingrove won the Scottish League and cup double.

English League
A series of friendly matches were arranged featuring the following teams -
 Cambridge University
 Grosvenor House Canadians
 London Lions
 Manchester
 Oxford University
 Prince's, Hammersmith
 Queen's Ice Club, Bayswater
 Sussex
 United Services

Scottish League
Nine teams participated in the league, and Kelvingrove won the championship and receiving the Canada Cup.

Regular season
Scores

Table

Mitchell Trophy

Results

References

British